East Towne Mall is a shopping center in Madison, Wisconsin, United States.

East Towne Mall may also refer to:

East Towne Mall (Tennessee), later known as Knoxville Center, in Knoxville, Tennessee

See also
East Town Mall in Green Bay, Wisconsin